Facchinia is a genus of flowering plants in the pink and carnation family Caryophyllaceae, native to the Pyrenees and the Alps. Many species in this genus were previously placed in Minuartia.

Species
There are six species and one subspecies in Facchinia:
Facchinia cerastiifolia (Ramond ex DC.) Dillenb. & Kadereit
Facchinia cherlerioides (Sieber) Dillenb. & Kadereit
F. cherlerioides subsp. aretioides  (Port. ex J.Gay) Dillenb. & Kadereit
Facchinia grignensis  (Rchb.) Dillenb. & Kadereit
Facchinia herniarioides  (Rion) Dillenb. & Kadereit
Facchinia rupestris  (Scop.) Dillenb. & Kadereit
Facchinia valentina  (Pau) Dillenb. & Kadereit

References

Caryophyllaceae
Caryophyllaceae genera
Taxa named by Ludwig Reichenbach